Bautista Bernasconi (born 14 September 2001) is an Argentine rugby union player, currently playing for United Rugby Championship side Benetton. His preferred position (first line) Hooker.

Jaguares XV and CASI
In 2021 and 2022 season he played for Jaguares XV in Superliga Americana de Rugby an for CASI in URBA.

Benetton
Bernasconi signed his contract for Benetton in January 2023 and he made his Benetton debut in Round 13 of the 2022–23 United Rugby Championship against Munster Rugby.

International career
In 2021 Bernasconi was named in the Argentina Under 20 squad. 
In May 2022 he was named in Argentina XV squad for of the 2022 July international window.

References

External links
 itsrugby Profile

2001 births
Living people
Argentine rugby union players
Jaguares (Super Rugby) players
Benetton Rugby players
Rugby union hookers